Lorenzo del Moro (1677-1735) was an Italian painter of the Rococo period, active mainly in his native Florence, and painting mainly quadratura.

He trained and later often worked with his cousin, Rinaldo Botti. He worked in the Church of San Domenico in Fiesole with Matteo Bonechi. He helped decorate the Sanctuary of Santa Verdiana in Castelfiorentino with the collaboration of Alessandro Gherardini. With Tommaso Redi, he helped decorate the Palazzo Altoviti and the Church of Santa Margherita de' Ricci. He also worked on the Monastery of Santa Maria Rosano. He worked in Pescia and Pistoia. After 1716, he embarked in a series of collaborations with Pietro Anderlini.

Sources

 Quadraturismo Site
Translated from Italian Wikipedia

External links

1677 births
1735 deaths
Painters from Florence
17th-century Italian painters
Italian male painters
18th-century Italian painters
Italian Baroque painters
Quadratura painters
18th-century Italian male artists